Ras Abu Aboud is a district located in the municipality of Doha in Qatar. It is an industrial district containing power and desalination plants. It accommodates one of the three major power stations which supply electricity to the whole country.

History
In the 1820s, George Barnes Brucks carried out the first British survey of the Persian Gulf. He recorded the following notes about Ras Abu Aboud, which he referred to as Ras Boo Aboot:

The British Hydrographic Office conducted a survey of the Persian Gulf in 1890 and wrote the following description of Ras Abu Aboud:

Landmarks

Ras Abu Aboud Civil Defense.
Qatar Table Tennis Association.
Doha Sailing Club on Ras Abu Aboud Street.
Sharq Village and Spa on Ras Abu Aboud Street.
Marriott Hotel on Ras Abu Aboud Street.
Housing Section, Human Resources Department of the Ministry of Municipality and Environment on Tabouk Street.

Industrial infrastructure

Power station
Inaugurated in 1963, the Ras Abu Aboud power station was built at a cost of QR 1 billion. It had a capacity of 60 MW in 1970, and an expansion in 1972 increased this to 90 MW. After several more expansions, by 1976 its capacity had been increased to 102.5 MW. 

By 1984 its capacity was more than doubled to 210 MW.

Desalination plant
In 1983, over QR 50 million had been invested in the desalination plant and it had a production of 11.5 million gallons per day.

QatarEnergy
QatarEnergy handles its Doha operations out of Ras Abu Aboud. The following facilities of QatarEnergy are based in Ras Abu Aboud:
Training Center.
Environmental Affairs Department on Ras Abu Aboud Street.
Information Technology Department Ras Abu Aboud Street.
Technical Records Center, Oil and Gas Ventures Services Department on Ras Abu Aboud Street.
Doha Distribution Center on Ras Abu Aboud Street.
Environmental Affairs Department on Ras Abu Aboud Street.

Transport
Currently, the underground Ras Abu Aboud Metro Station is under construction, having been launched during Phase 1. Once completed, it will be part of Doha Metro's Gold Line.

Sports
A temporary football stadium known as Stadium 974 was constructed in Ras Abu Aboud to host matches during the 2022 FIFA World Cup. The stadium carries a modular design and incorporates recycled shipping containers; it is designed to be disassembled following the conclusion of the tournament.

Demographics

References

Doha
Communities in Doha